This list covers television programs whose first letter (excluding "the") of the title are K and L.

K

Numbers 
K3
K9

KA
KaBlam!
Kaeloo
Kaiketsu Zorro
Kaiketsu Zubat
Kaiki Renai Sakusen
Kami-sama Minarai: Himitsu no Cocotama (Japan)
Kamp Koral: SpongeBob's Under Years
The Kandi Factory
Kandi's Ski Trip
Kandi's Wedding
Kappa Mikey
Karen (1964–1965)
Karen (1975)
Karen Sisco
Kate & Allie
Kate & Mim-Mim
Kate Plus 8
Kath & Kim (Australia)
Kath & Kim (US)
Kathy
Kathy Griffin: My Life on the D-List
Kazoku no Katachi (Japan)
Kazoops!

KC
K.C. Undercover

KE
Keep It Spotless
The Keepers
Keeping Up Appearances
Keeping Up with the Kardashians
Keijo!!!!!!!!
Kell on Earth
The Kelly Clarkson Show
The Kelly File
Kemono Friends
Kenan & Kel
Kendra
Kendra on Top
Kenny the Shark
Kenny vs. Spenny
Kentucky Jones
Kept
Kerwhizz
Kesha: My Crazy Beautiful Life
Kevin Can Wait
Kevin Hill
Kevin (Probably) Saves the World
Key & Peele

KH
Khloé & Lamar

KI
Kick Buttowski: Suburban Daredevil
Kickin' It
Kid in a Candy Store
Kid Nation
Kidd Video
The Kids Are Alright
Kids Baking Championship
The Kids from Room 402
Kids Incorporated
The Kids in the Hall
The Kids in the Hall: Death Comes to Town
The Kids of Degrassi Street (Canada) 
Kid Cosmic 
Kid Paddle 
Kid vs. Kat
Killer Instinct
Killer Karaoke
Killer Kids
Killer Women
Kill la Kill
 The Killing
 The Killing Fields
Killing Eve
Kim's Convenience (Canada)
Kim Possible
Kimba the White Lion
Kimora: Life in the Fab Lane
Kindergarten
Kindred Spirits
King
The King Family Show
The King and I (South Korea)
King of Kensington
The King of Queens
King of the Hill
Kingdom (UK)
Kingdom (US)
Kingdom Hospital
Kingin' with Tyga
Kingpin
Kings
Kings of Pain
Kingston: Confidential
Kinniku Banzuke (Japan)
Kipo and the Age of Wonderbeasts
 Kipper
Kirby Buckets
 Kissyfur
Kitchen Boss
Kitchen Confidential
Kitchen Nightmares
 Kitty Is Not a Cat

KL
Klondike

KN
Knightmare
Knight Rider (1982)
Knight Rider (2008)
Knight Squad
The Knights of Prosperity
Knots Landing
Knowing Me, Knowing You

KO
The Koala Brothers
Kodiak
Kodoku no Gourmet
Kody Kapow
Kojak
Kolchak: The Night Stalker
K-On!
Kourtney and Khloé Take The Hamptons
Kourtney and Kim Take Miami
Kourtney and Kim Take New York

KR
Kraft Music Hall
Kraft Television Theatre
Kroll Show
Krypto the Superdog
The Krypton Factor

KU
Kukla, Fran and Ollie
Kung Fu
Kung Fu Dino Posse
Kung Fu Panda Legends of Awesomeness
Kunoichi (Japan)
Kuu Kuu Harajuku

KV
K-Ville

KW
The Kwicky Koala Show

KY
Kyle XY
Kyōryū Sentai Zyuranger

L
The L Word

LA
LA to Vegas
L.A.'s Finest
Lab Rats (UK)
Lab Rats (US)
Lab Rats: Elite Force
Labor of Love
L.A. Clippers Dance Squad
La CQ (Mexico)
Lachey's: Raising the Bar
Ladies of London
Lady Lovely Locks
La Femme Nikita (Canada)
Laguna Beach: The Real Orange County
L.A. Hair
LA Ink
Lalaloopsy
L.A. Law
La Linea
Lamb Chop's Play-Along
Lancer
The Land Before Time
Land of the Giants
Land of the Lost (1974)
Land of the Lost (1991)
LAPD: Life on the Beat
Laramie
Laredo
Larry King Live
Larry King Now
Lassie
Last Call
Last Call with Carson Daly
Last Comic Standing
The Last Defense
The Last Kids on Earth
The Last Kingdom
The Last Man on Earth
Last Man Standing
Last of the Summer Wine (UK)
Las Vegas
Last Week Tonight with John Oliver
The Late Late Show
The Late Late Show with Craig Ferguson
The Late Late Show with James Corden
Late Night
Late Night with Conan O'Brien
Late Night with David Letterman
Late Night with Jimmy Fallon
Late Night with Seth Meyers
Late Night Joy
The Late Show
Late Show with David Letterman
The Late Show with Stephen Colbert
Later with Bob Costas
Later with Greg Kinnear
Later with Cynthia Garrett
The Latest Buzz
Laverne & Shirley
Law & Order (UK)
Law & Order
Law & Order
Law & Order: Criminal Intent
Law & Order: LA
Law & Order: Special Victims Unit
Law & Order: Trial by Jury
Law & Order True Crime
Law & Order: UK
Lawman
The Lawrence Welk Show
The Layover
Lazer Tag Academy
LazyTown

LE
The Lead with Jake Tapper
The League of Gentlemen
Leah Remini: It's All Relative
Leah Remini: Scientology and the Aftermath
Leap Years
Leave It to Beaver
Leave It to Lamas
Legacies
Legendary
Legendary Dudas
The Legend of Korra 
Legend of the Seeker
The Legend of Tarzan
The Legend of Zelda
Legends of Chima
Legends of the Hidden Temple
Legends of Tomorrow
Legion
Legion of Super Heroes
Les Misérables
Less than Perfect
Let's Dance (Germany)
Let's Make a Deal
Let The Blood Run Free
Lethal Weapon
The Letter People
Level Up
Leverage
Lewis (UK)
Lexx
Lego City
Lego City Adventures
 Lego Friends
 Lego Star Wars: The Freemaker Adventures

LI
Liberty Street
Liberty's Kids
The Librarians
Lidsville
Lie to Me
Life
Life After People
The Life and Legend of Wyatt Earp
The Life and Times of Juniper Lee
Life Begins at Eighty
Life Goes On
Life in Pieces
Life Is Wild
Life is Worth Living
Life of Kylie
The Life of Riley
Life of Ryan
Life on Mars (UK)
Life on Mars (US)
Lifestyles of the Rich and Famous
Life with Boys
Life with Derek (Canada)
Life with La Toya
Life with Louie
Life with Lucy
Life's Too Short
Life Unexpected
Lightning Point
Lights Out with David Spade
Lilo & Stitch
Lilyhammer
Lily's Driftwood Bay
Limitless
Lindenstraße (Germany)
Lindsay
Lindsay Lohan's Beach Club
The Lineup
Lingo (UK)
Lingo (US)
The Lion Guard
Lip Sync Battle
Lip Sync Battle Shorties
Lipstick Jungle
Liquid Television
Listen Up!
Little Bear
Little Big Shots (Australia)
Little Big Shots (UK)
Little Big Shots (US)
Little Bill
Little Britain (UK)
Little Britain USA
Little Charmers
The Little Couple
A Little Curious
Little Einsteins
Little Ellen
Little House on the Prairie
A Little Late with Lilly Singh
Little Lulu
Little Lunch (Australia)
The Little Mermaid
Little Mosque on the Prairie
Little Muppet Monsters
The Little People
Little People (2016)
Little People, Big World
Little People Big World: Wedding Farm
The Little Prince (France)
Little Rascals
Little Robots
Little Shop
Little Women (UK) (1950)
Little Women (UK) (1958)
Little Women (UK) (1970)
Little Women (Japan)
Little Women II: Jo's Boys (Japan)
Little Women: LA
Little Women: NY
The Littles
Littlest Pet Shop
Littlest Pet Shop: A World of Our Own
Liv and Maddie
Live at 3 (Ireland)
The Live Desk (UK)
The Live Desk (US)
Live from Studio Five (UK)
Live with Regis and Kathie Lee
Live with Regis and Kelly
Live with Kelly and Michael
Live with Kelly and Ryan
Live It Up!
Live PD
Lives on Fire
The Living Century
Living with the Enemy
Living It Up! With Ali & Jack
Living Lohan
Living Single
Livin' Lozada
Liza on Demand
Lizzie McGuire

LL
Llama Llama
Lloyd in Space

LO
Lobo
Location, Location, Location (UK)
Lockie Leonard
Lodge 49
Loft Story (France)
Logan's Run
Lois & Clark: The New Adventures of Superman
Loiter Squad
Loki
Lola & Virginia
LoliRock
LOLwork
London Ink (UK)
The Lone Gunmen
The Lone Ranger
The Loner
Loggerheads (Germany)
Long Island Medium
Long Lost Family (Australia)
Long Lost Family (UK)
Long Lost Family (US)
Longmire
Longstreet
Look Around You
Look North
Loonatics Unleashed
Looney Tunes
The Looney Tunes Show
The Loop
Loose Women (UK)
Loosely Exactly Nicole
Looped
Lopez
Lopez Tonight
Lore
The Loretta Young Show
Lost
Lost in Oz
Lost in Space
The Lost Room
Lost Song
Lotsa Luck
The Loud House
Lou Grant
Louie
Love
Love, American Style
Love and Marriage (1959–1960)
Love and Marriage (1996)
Love, Victor
The Love Boat
Love Connection
Love, Death & Robots
Love Games: Bad Girls Need Love Too
Love Is Blind
Love Island (UK) (2005)
Love Island (UK) (2015)
Love Island
Love Island Australia
Love & Hip Hop
Love & Hip Hop: Atlanta
Love & Hip Hop: Hollywood
Love & Hip Hop: Miami
Love & Hip Hop: New York
Love in the Wild
Love Is in the Heir
Love It or List It
Love It or List It Vancouver
Lovejoy
Love Life
Love of Life
Love on a Rooftop
Love, Sidney
Love That Jill
Love Thy Neighbor
Lovetown, USA
Love & War
Loving

LU
Lucas Tanner
Lucha Underground
Lucifer
Lucky Louie
The Lucy–Desi Comedy Hour
 The Lucy Show
 Lucy, the Daughter of the Devil
Luis
Luke Cage
Luna Petunia
Lunar Jim
Lunch with Soupy Sales
Lupin the 3rd (Japan)
Luther
Lux Video Theatre
Lucky Fred
Lucky Star

LY
The Lying Game

Previous:  List of television programs: I-J    Next:  List of television programs: M